Gretchen Egolf (born September 9, 1973) is an American theater, film and television actress.

Early life and education 
Egolf was born and raised in Lancaster, Pennsylvania. She is the daughter of artist Paula Egolf and stepfather Gary Egolf. Her brother was the writer Tristan Egolf. Her younger half-brother is British-American musician Siegfried Faith. Egolf earned a Bachelor of Fine Arts from the Juilliard School and also took acting classes at The Actors Center.

Career

Television and film 
Gretchen Egolf is most known for her various television roles, including Journeyman (NBC, 2007), Roswell (WB, 2000), and Law & Order: Special Victims Unit (NBC, 2009–2012), among others, and the TV movies The Two Mr. Kissels (Lifetime 2008) and Gleason (CBS, 2002).

Her film roles include The Talented Mr. Ripley, The Namesake, and Quiz Show.

Theatre 
After winning the Michel St. Denis Award for an Exceptional Graduating Drama Student from the Juilliard School, Egolf went on to perform on Broadway in Jackie, An American Life by Gip Hoppe (also in London's West End) and Jean Anouilh’s Ring Round the Moon with Lincoln Center for the Performing Arts on Broadway, directed by Gerald Gutierrez. 
Off-Broadway, Egolf has appeared in Davey Holmes’ More Lies About Jerzy at The Vineyard Theater and a number of new plays with Second Stage Theatre, The Flea Theater (in Polly Draper’s Getting Into Heaven), The Women's Project Theatre, and Dodger Stages (now New World Stages) (in Modern Orthodox, directed by James Lapine).

Egolf has also worked in many American regional theaters. She received critical acclaim for her Blanche DuBois in A Streetcar Named Desire at The Guthrie Theater (directed by John Miller-Stephany), Emma in Betrayal at the Huntington Theatre Company (directed by Maria Aitken), Helena in A Midsummer Night's Dream at The Old Globe Theatre, Candida in Candida and Rosalind (As You Like It) at Pittsburgh Public Theater, Emily in Arthur Miller's Resurrection Blues at Wilma Theater (Philadelphia) and other plays with Berkshire Theater Festival (including Hay Fever with Joanne Woodward) and Barrington Stage Company, with whom she is an Artistic Associate

Other projects 
Egolf has been involved in a number of artist films and videos, including Beth Campbell’s Some Things Change (2005), and Adam Chodzko’s video installation Knots at Tate Britain (2013) as well as Chodzko's radio and performance piece, Rising (2013), for solo actor, which she performed live in Newcastle, UK at the Great North Run/British Science Festival, and at Manchester University, UK at the Ways of Seeing Climate Change conference (October 2013). 
Egolf has also created written works, such as her invited guest contribution to the online experimental art curatorial project Out of Focus. She also wrote a blog of her rehearsal experience playing Blanche DuBois in A Streetcar Named Desire at The Guthrie Theater.
As a director and producer; Egolf created and directed the short film Sonnet 147 for the New York Shakespeare Exchange’s Sonnet Project and co-produced and starred in the short film Speck’s Last and the web series Selectmen.

Teaching 
Egolf is a teacher of the Michael Chekhov acting technique. She has taught in the US at The Guthrie Theater and Barrington Stage Company, as well as independent classes in New York City, and in London at the Royal Central School of Speech and Drama, London Academy of Music and Dramatic Art, and independent classes.

Personal life 
Egolf was married to actor Mason Phillips in 1999. The couple divorced a few years later. 
She married British artist Adam Chodzko in 2013 and now lives and works in both the US and UK.

Filmography

Television 
 Cracker – "Nina", 1 episode, 1997
 Martial Law- "Amy Dylan", 1999–2000
 Roswell- "Vanessa Whitaker", 4 episodes, 2000
 A Nero Wolfe Mystery – "Marian Hinckley", "The Doorbell Rang", 2001
 Corsairs, 2002
 Law & Order – "Sherri Rosatti", 1 episode, 2002
 Without a Trace – 1 episode, 2003
 Journeyman- "Katie Vasser", 2007
 Knight Rider – "Tess Landafly", 1 episode, 2008
 Medium- "Mary Stacey", 2 episodes, 2008
 NCIS – "Detective Andrea Sparr", 1 episode, 2008
 Ghost Whisperer – "Deborah Marks", 1 episode, 2009
 Criminal Minds- "Sarah Murphy", 1 episode, 2009
 Lie To Me- "Catherine", 1 episode, 2009
 CSI: Miami – "Ellen Sheffield", 1 episode, 2009
 Eden- 2011
 Blue Bloods- "Ann Cleary", 1 episode, 2011
 The Good Wife- "Mia Lambros", 1 episode, 2011
 Law & Order: Special Victims Unit – "ADA Kendra Gill", 4 episodes, 2009–2012
 Doctor Who – "The Zygon Invasion", 2015

Movies 
 Quiz Show, – 1994
 The Talented Mr. Ripley – "Fran", 1999
 Nicolas, 2001
 Gleason- "Genevieve Halford", 2002
 The Namesake- "Astrid", 2006
 Falling for Grace - "Bridget", 2006
 The Two Mr. Kissels- "Haley Wolff", 2008
 The Hangover - "Phil's wife", 2009

Theater credits

Broadway

Ring Round the Moon – "Isabelle". Belasco Theatre, Lincoln Center on Broadway, New York, 1999, directed by Gerald Gutierrez.
Jackie: An American Life – Belasco Theatre, New York, 1997–98, directed by Gip Hoppe. Also at Queen's Theatre, London, 1998.

Off-Broadway

 More Lies About Jerzy – "Georgia". Vineyard Theatre, New York, 2001, directed by Darko Tresnjak.
All This Intimacy – "Jen". Second Stage Theatre, New York, 2006.
Modern Orthodox – "Hannah". Dodger Stages (now New World Stages), New York, 2005, directed by James Lapine.
Getting into Heaven – "Rose". The Flea Theater, New York, 2003.
Crocodiles in the Potomac. Women's Project Theater, New York, 1995, directed by Suzanne Bennett.
Speed-the-Plow – "Karen". The Alchemy Theatre Company at Arclight Theatre, New York, 1995.
Speck's Last – "Greta". Atlantic Theater Company, New York, 2004, directed by Michael Dowling.

Regional theater

Candida – "Candida." Directed by Ted Pappas, Pittsburgh Public Theater, Pittsburgh, 2014.
Arcadia – "Hannah." Directed by Carey Perloff, American Conservatory Theater, San Francisco, 2013.
Much Ado about Nothing – "Beatrice." Directed by Julianne Boyd, Barrington Stage Company, Pittsfield, Massachusetts, 2013.
Betrayal – "Emma." Directed by Maria Aitken, Huntington Theatre Company, Boston, 2012.
As You Like It – Rosalind. Directed by Ted Pappas, Pittsburgh Public Theater, Pittsburgh, 2012.
 A Streetcar Named Desire – "Blanche DuBois". Directed by John Miller-Stephany, The Guthrie Theatre, Minneapolis, 2010.
Private Lives – "Amanda." Directed by Julianne Boyd, Barrington Stage Company, Pittsfield, Massachusetts, 2008.
A Picasso – "Ms Fischer". Directed by Tyler Marchant, Barrington Stage Company, Pittsfield, Massachusetts, 2007.
Going to St. Ives – "Dr Cora Gage." Directed by Tyler Marchant, Barrington Stage Company, Pittsfield, Massachusetts, 2001.
Design for Living – "Gilda." Directed by Michael Kahn, Shakespeare Theatre Company, Washington, D.C., 2009.
 The Secret Letters of Jackie and Marilyn – "Jackie." Directed by Leonard Foglia, Pittsburgh Public Theater, Pittsburgh, 2006.
Boston Marriage – "Claire". Directed by Michael Dowling, Chester Theater, Massachusetts 2005.
Resurrection Blues – "Emily Shapiro" Directed by Jiri Ziska, Wilma Theater (Philadelphia),
A Midsummer Night's Dream – "Helena." Directed by Kyle Donnelly, Old Globe Theatre, San Diego, 2001.
Indiscretions – "Madeleine.", Coconut Grove Playhouse, Florida, 1995.
Hay Fever – "Sorel Bliss." (with Joanne Woodward), Berkshire Theater Festival, Stockbridge, Massachusetts, 1996.
Keely and Du – "Keely", Berkshire Theater Festival, Stockbridge, Massachusetts, 1995.
Four Dogs and a Bone, Berkshire Theater Festival, Stockbridge, Massachusetts, 1995.
The Illusion, Berkshire Theater Festival, Stockbridge, Massachusetts. 1995.

References

External links
Gretchen Egolf official website

   Gretchen Egolf's short film for the NY Shakespeare Exchange's Sonnet Project

1973 births
American film actresses
American television actresses
American stage actresses
Living people
Actors from Lancaster, Pennsylvania
Actresses from Pennsylvania
20th-century American actresses
21st-century American actresses
Juilliard School alumni